Wilbur Paul "Bud" Marquardt (December 15, 1913 – October 21, 1989) was a Canadian football player who played for the Winnipeg Blue Bombers. He won the Grey Cup with them in 1939 and 1941 and is a member of the Blue Bombers Hall of Fame. He attended North Dakota State University, where he is also a member of their hall of fame. In 2004, he was inducted into the Manitoba Sports Hall of Fame.

References

1913 births
1989 deaths
American football ends
Canadian football ends
American players of Canadian football
North Dakota State Bison football players
Winnipeg Blue Bombers players
Manitoba Sports Hall of Fame inductees
Players of American football from North Dakota
People from Adams County, North Dakota